Valerie A Nares-Pillow (born 1936), is a female former swimmer who competed for England.

Swimming career
She represented England and won a bronze medal in the 440 yards freestyle relay at the 1954 British Empire and Commonwealth Games in Vancouver, Canada.

She was a member of the Surrey Ladies Swimming Club.

Personal life
She married Michael Montague in 1959 and was later known as Valerie Preston. Valerie died on the 29th October 2022 at the age of 86.

References

1936 births
English female swimmers
Commonwealth Games medallists in swimming
Commonwealth Games bronze medallists for England
Swimmers at the 1954 British Empire and Commonwealth Games
Living people
Medallists at the 1954 British Empire and Commonwealth Games